Gar Tsenye Dompu (? – 685) was a general of the Tibetan Empire. He was the eldest son of minister Gar Tongtsen Yülsung. In Chinese records, his name was given as Zàn Xīruò.

The Lönchen Gar Tongtsen died of neck cancer in 'A-zha in 667, leaving his position vacant. Though many officials regarded We Sungnang as the most suitable candidate, Mangsong Mangtsen still appointed Tsenye as the Lönchen.

Gar Tsenye raided the remaining Chinese territories in the Tarim Basin in 673. He came into conflict with another minister Gar Mangnyen Taktsab, then, met on the battleground in 685. He died by a river in Sumpa.

His brother Gar Trinring Tsendro quickly put down the rebellion then had Mangnyen Taktsab purged. Later, Trinring was appointed as the new Lönchen.

References
Old Tibetan Chronicle, P.T. 1287
Old Tibetan Annals (version I), P.T. 1288

7th-century Tibetan people
People of the Tibetan Empire
685 deaths
Tibetan military leaders
Tang–Tibet relations